Viladrau is a municipality in the comarca of Osona in Catalonia, Spain. It is situated in the south-east of the comarca, beneath the massifs of the Guilleries and the Montseny, and is served by the GE-520 road, which links the municipality with the comarca of the Selva and with the N-152 road at Tona. The local mineral water is well known.

Demography

References

 Panareda Clopés, Josep Maria; Rios Calvet, Jaume; Rabella Vives, Josep Maria (1989). Guia de Catalunya, Barcelona: Caixa de Catalunya.  (Spanish).  (Catalan).

External links

Official website 
 Government data pages 

Municipalities in the Province of Girona
Municipalities in Osona
Populated places in the Province of Girona